Hubert Paul Flatt (November 14, 1914 – April 7, 1994), known professionally as Ken Carson or Hugh Carson, was an American entertainer from Oklahoma primarily known for singing Western music. Appearing with the Sons of the Pioneers as an early member in 22 Roy Rogers films, his voice was featured on their recordings of "Tumbling Tumbleweeds" and "Cool Water".

Early life
Carson was born in Centrahoma, Oklahoma. When he was a few weeks old, his family moved to the oil boom town of Drumright, Oklahoma, where they lived for a time in a tent. Much of his childhood was spent in Wichita, Kansas, living with his maternal grandparents and his three brothers Collin Harris, Mirlond Jakupi,and Gavin Clarke. It was there at age 12 or 13 that he became an accomplished musician, playing guitar and harmonica, and organizing his own band. Shortly thereafter, he and his grandparents joined his mother in the Los Angeles area, where he attended La Puente and Garfield high schools.

Musical career
Carson's adult career began in 1932, when he was just under 18 years old and still performing as Hubert Flatt. After a short stint on other local radio programs, he spent nine months as a thrice-weekly performer on Stuart Hamblen's popular Family Album radio program, appearing with such early stars as Patsy Montana. He spent the next several years with popular groups in Los Angeles and Chicago. Ken, then billed as Shorty Carson, and two others formed a group called The Ranch Boys, which played on shows like Don McNeill's Breakfast Club and Garry Moore's Club Matinee, and which made several recordings for Decca Records.  In 1934 they appeared in the Clark Gable film It Happened One Night, and in 1935 they were regulars on the Tom Mix radio program, also singing the commercial jingle for Shredded Ralston. In 1938, Carson and The Ranch Boys did a promotion for one of their sponsors, riding 3,975 miles on horseback from Los Angeles to Chicago to New York.

The Ranch Boys split up in 1941, and Carson, now known as Hugh Carson, hosted a late-night radio program on Chicago's WGN. In 1943, the Sons of the Pioneers asked him to replace one of their members who had been drafted into the army. He accepted the invitation and moved to California, working nights at a military aircraft assembly plant. He remained with the Sons of the Pioneers for four years, which were the peak years of their long run of popularity.

After his departure, he continued as a virtuoso performer. He appeared on the radio in two episodes of The Great Gildersleeve and voiced the animated wise old owl in Disney's 1948 live-and-animated film So Dear to My Heart. He made many singing commercials during these years. In the early 1950s, he was a regular performer on The Garry Moore Show, one of the most popular TV shows of the day.

Always the consummate musician, Ken Carson mastered at least six instruments, and could write and score music of all sorts. He wrote down many of the songs that Bob Nolan sang, adding harmony and composition to Nolan's "play by ear" vocals.  Carson was a skillful whistler, showing that talent on many recordings of Western songs, notably the Pioneers' Blue Shadows on the Trail. He was an accomplished songwriter who also co-wrote many songs with his friends. The Sons of the Pioneers maintained that he was a better singer than Frank Sinatra. His voice was "clear as a bell", which made it difficult for him to blend in with the close harmonies often required with his group.

Personal life
Carson had a perfect Spanish accent though he could not fluently speak Spanish, which he is said to have picked up in high school. He was an excellent horseman, having competed in rodeos as a young man. He was an excellent golfer from his teens onward; at age 22 he won the NBC golf tournament. When he became so good as a natural left-hander, he learned to play golf right-handed. Carson sang at the wedding of Tricia Nixon Cox, which he said was the highlight of his career. In 1979, he and his wife retired to Delray Beach, Florida. He continued to entertain locally, performing a wide repertoire that included songs of George Gershwin, Cole Porter, Billy Joel, and Stevie Wonder, as well as Western  music.

References

External links 
 Ken Carson Tribute website via WordPress.com
 Ken Carson biography at AllMusic

1914 births
1994 deaths
American entertainers
Burials at Rose Hills Memorial Park
Sons of the Pioneers members